Ödeshög is a locality and the seat of Ödeshög Municipality, Östergötland County, Sweden with 2,572 inhabitants in 2010.

Personalities
Ödeshög is the birthplace of former Swedish professional football player Klas Ingesson.

Twin towns
 Obol, Belarus

References

External links

Municipal seats of Östergötland County
Swedish municipal seats
Populated places in Östergötland County
Populated places in Ödeshög Municipality